Massimo Popolizio (born 4 July 1961) is an Italian actor and voice actor.

Biography
Massimo Popolizio studied at the Silvio D'Amico National Academy of Dramatic Arts in Rome in 1984, Popolizio started his career as a stage actor and, after graduation, started a fruitful artistic collaboration with theater director Luca Ronconi. In 1995 he won a UBU Award as Best Actor for his work in Shakespeare's King Lear and Towards Peer Gynt inspired by Peer Gynt by Henrik Ibsen, and again in 2001 for his role in Carlo Goldoni's 1747 play The Venetian Twins. In 2006 he won the Golden Aeschylus, conferred by the National Classic Drama Institute (INDA). In 2012, Popolizio returned to Ibsen in the title role of the stage work John Gabriel Borkman, with Lucrezia Lante della Rovere and Manuela Mandracchia. In 2013 he played Don Palma in the TV show Una grande famiglia.

Popolizio lent his voice for the Italian dubbing of Lord Voldemort in the Harry Potter films, to Tom Cruise (Dr. William "Bill" Harford) in Eyes Wide Shut and to the voice of Lionel Abelanski (Shlomo) in Train of Life. He acquired visibility with his more recent film roles in Crime Novel, Black Sea and My Brother Is an Only Child, as well as in the role of Victor Sbardella in Il Divo by Paolo Sorrentino. In 1998 he won the Silver Ribbon for the dubbing of the film Hamlet, directed by Kenneth Branagh. In 1998 he voiced Tim Roth in the role of Danny Boodman TD Lemon 1900 in the film The Legend of 1900. In 2009 he was the Italian voice of actor Cal Lightman, the protagonist of the series Lie to Me (also played by Tim Roth). In 2013, he returned to the cinema with Welcome Mr. President and The Great Beauty.

Filmography

Cinema
Un ragazzo come tanti (1983)
L'assassina (1989)
Caccia alle mosche (1993)
Heartless (1995)
The Elective Affinities (1996)
Romanzo Criminale (2005)
Mare nero (2006)
My Brother Is an Only Child (2007)
Il divo (2008)
The Big Dream (2009)
The Santa Claus Gang (2010)
20 Cigarettes (2010)
Boris - Il film (2011)
Drifters (2011)
Steel (2012)
Welcome Mr. President (2013)
The Great Beauty (2013)
Amici come noi (2014)
Leopardi (2014)
The Rich, the Pauper and the Butler (2014)
Arianna (2015)
The Big Score (2016)
Era d'estate (2016)
I'm Back (2018)
Once Upon a Time... in Bethlehem (2019)
The Predators (2020)

Television
Requiem per voce e pianoforte, directed by Tomaso Sherman - miniserie TV (1991)
La famiglia Ricordi, directed by Mauro Bolognini - miniserie TV (1995)
L'attentatuni - Il grande attentato, directed by Claudio Bonivento - film TV (2001)
Il Grande Torino, directed by Claudio Bonivento - film TV (2005) 
La stagione dei delitti, directed by Claudio Bonivento, Donatella Maiorca e Daniele Costantini - serie TV, 6 episodi (2007)
 Il delitto di via poma, directed by Roberto Faenza (2011)
 Il clan dei camorristi, directed by Alexis Sweet e Alessandro Angelini - Serie TV (2013)
 Una grande famiglia, seconda stagione, directed by Riccardo Milani - Serie TV (2013)
 Qualunque cosa succeda, directed by Alberto Negrin - Serie TV (2014)

Theatre
S. Giovanna, directed by Luca Ronconi (1983)
Due Commedie in Commedia, G. B. Andreini, directed by Luca Ronconi (1984)
Tasso, Goethe, directed by Cesare Lievi (1986)
Il Gabbiano, Anton Cechov, directed by Massimo Castri (1987)
Aiace, Sofocle, directed by Antonio Calenda (1988)
La Sposa di Messina, Friedrich Schiller, directed by Elio De Capitani (1990)
Gli Ultimi Giorni dell'Umanità, Karl Kraus, directed by Luca Ronconi (1992)
Misura per misura, William Shakespeare, directed by Luca Ronconi (1992)
Aminta, Torquato Tasso, directed by Luca Ronconi (1993)
Venezia Salva, Simone Weil, directed by Luca Ronconi (1993)
Peer Gynt, Henrik Ibsen, directed by Luca Ronconi (1995)
Re Lear, William Shakespeare, directed by Luca Ronconi (1995)
I Fratelli Karamazov, Fedor Dostoevskij, directed by Luca Ronconi (2001)
I Due Gemelli Veneziani, Carlo Goldoni, directed by Luca Ronconi (2001)
Lolita, Nabokov, directed by Luca Ronconi (2002)
Baccanti, Euripide, directed by Luca Ronconi (2002)
Rane, Aristofane, directed by Luca Ronconi (2002)
Professor Bernhardi, by Arthur Schnitzler, directed by Luca Ronconi (2005)
Cyrano de Bergerac, Rostand, directed by Daniele Abbado (2009)
Il misantropo, Molière, directed by Massimo Castri (2010)
Blackbird, D. Harrower, directed by Lluis Pasqual (2011)
John Gabriel Borkman, by Ibsen, directed by Piero Maccarinelli (2012)
 Visita al padre, by Roland Schimmelpfennig, directed by Carmelo Rifici (2014)

Dubbing

Movies
Ralph Fiennes in Harry Potter and the Goblet of Fire, Harry Potter and the Order of the Phoenix, Harry Potter and the Deathly Hallows – Part 1, Harry Potter and the Deathly Hallows – Part 2
Daniel Auteuil in Sostiene Pereira, Sade and in The Eighth Day
Bruce Willis in Armageddon
Tom Cruise in Eyes Wide Shut
Tim Roth in The Legend of 1900 and Lie to Me
Kenneth Branagh in Hamlet and Othello
Lionel Abelanski in Train of Life
Mark Rylance in Anonymous
Crispin Glover in Beowulf
Ulrich Noethen in Comedian Harmonists
Ulrich Mühe in My Führer – The Really Truest Truth about Adolf Hitler

References

External links

2005: Il deserto dei tartari su Radio 3 letto da Massimo Popolizio (Il Terzo Anello - Ad alta voce): 23 puntate, formato .ram
2006:  Il maestro e Margherita su Radio 3 letto da Massimo Popolizio (Il Terzo Anello - Ad alta voce): 22 puntate, formato .ram
2007:  Le avventure di Tom Sayer di Mark Twain, su Radio 3 letto da Massimo Popolizio (Il Terzo Anello - Ad alta voce): 20 puntate, formato .ram
2008:  Le memorie di Barry Lindon su Radio 3 letto da Massimo Popolizio (Il Terzo Anello - Ad alta voce):  puntate formato .ram

1961 births
Living people
Italian male film actors
Italian male stage actors
Italian male television actors
Italian male voice actors
20th-century Italian male actors
21st-century Italian male actors
Accademia Nazionale di Arte Drammatica Silvio D'Amico alumni
People of Apulian descent